Lal Babu Rai (born 1946) is an Indian politician. Before entering politics he was a lawyer in Patna high court. He began his political career  contesting from Chapra assembly seat from Jan sangh ticket in 1975. He was later elected to the Lok Sabha, the lower house of the Parliament of India from Chapra, Bihar as a member of the Janata Dal, in 1990 by-poll and 1991 general election.

References

External links
Official biographical sketch on the Parliament of India website

1946 births
Living people
Janata Dal politicians
Lok Sabha members from Bihar
India MPs 1989–1991
India MPs 1991–1996
People from Saran district